Kulsary (Qūlsary) is a town  and the center of the Zhylyoi District in the Atyrau Region of western Kazakhstan. Population:  

The city is located 11 kilometers from the Emba River, and 230 kilometers from the city of Atyrau, the center of the Atyrau Region.  The railroad station is on the Makat-Beyneu line.

The city is home to the mining of petroleum and a scrap metal processing plant. It also has a most remarkable cemetery made up of domed chambers large enough to be houses.

Climate
Kulsary has a cold desert climate (Köppen climate classification: BWk).

References

Populated places in Atyrau Region